Gabriele Ambrosio (1844 – July 19, 1918) was an Italian sculptor.

He was born and died in Turin. He trained under Vincenzo Vela in Accademia Albertina. He joined the 1866 campaign for Italian independence. He was knighted Cavaliere of the Order of the Crown of Italy. Among his works are:
Monument to Angelo Brofferio, Turin, 1871
Monument to Giovanni Battista Bodoni, Saluzzo, 1872
Monument to Diodata Saluzzo, Saluzzo, 1874
Monument to Giovanni Garelli, Mondovì, 1875
Monument to Paul Amilhau, Mondovì, 1875
Monument to General Ettore Perrone di San Martino, Ivrea
Monument to Vincenzo Troya, Magliano d'Alba

References

Partially translated from Italian Wikipedia entry

1844 births
1918 deaths
Artists from Turin
20th-century Italian sculptors
20th-century Italian male artists
19th-century Italian sculptors
19th-century Italian male artists
Italian male sculptors